Gautam Shome (born 5 June 1963), known in his playing days as Gautam Shome Junior, is an Indian former cricketer. He played 29 first-class matches for Bengal between 1985 and 1998.

See also
 List of Bengal cricketers

References

External links
 

1963 births
Living people
Indian cricketers
Bengal cricketers
Cricketers from Kolkata